Langeveen is a village in the Dutch province of Overijssel. It is a part of the municipality of Tubbergen, and lies about 13 km north of Almelo.

It was first mentioned in 1851 as Langeveen, and means "long bog". In 1803, the first person received permission to settle in the area. In 1843, a little church was built. A little Lourdes Chapel was built in the village.

References

Populated places in Overijssel
Tubbergen